In mathematics, the Heawood number of a surface is an upper bound for the number of colors that suffice to color any graph embedded in the surface. 

In 1890 Heawood proved for all surfaces except the sphere that no more than

 	

colors are needed to color any graph embedded in a surface of Euler characteristic , or genus  for an orientable surface. 
The number  became known as Heawood number in 1976.

Later it was proved in the works of Gerhard Ringel, J. W. T. Youngs, and other contributors that the complete graph with  vertices can be embedded in the surface  unless  is the Klein bottle. This established that Heawood's bound could not be improved.

For example, the complete graph on  vertices can be embedded in the torus as follows:

The case of the sphere is the four-color conjecture, which was settled by Kenneth Appel and Wolfgang Haken in 1976.

Notes
 Béla Bollobás, Graph Theory: An Introductory Course, Graduate Texts in Mathematics, volume 63, Springer-Verlag, 1979. .
 Thomas L. Saaty and Paul Chester Kainen; The Four-Color Problem: Assaults and Conquest, Dover, 1986. .

References

Topological graph theory
Graph coloring